The following is a list of transfers for the teams of the United Soccer League, the third tier of the United States soccer pyramid, for the 2016 season. The transactions begin at the conclusion of the 2015 USL season and end after the championship match of the 2016 season. New players who are listed on a club's official roster but with no official announcement being made appear at the end of the list.

Transfers

References

External links 
Official USL website
Official USL Transactions 2016

USL
Transfers
2016